Andrew Boyd Cummings (22 June 1830 – 18 March 1863) was an officer in the United States Navy during the American Civil War who was killed in action off the coast of Louisiana. Two naval ships, USS Cummings, have been named in his honor.

Biography
Born in Philadelphia, Pennsylvania, Cummings was appointed midshipman in 1846, but was detached from the Naval Academy the next year for active duty in Brandywine, returning to school in 1852.

During the Civil War, he served with distinction in Admiral David Farragut's West Gulf Blockading Squadron as the Executive Officer of Richmond, participating in the action at Forts Jackson and Saint Philip, Louisiana. He showed conspicuous gallantry as the squadron passed the batteries of Port Hudson, Louisiana, 14–15 March 1863, and died of wounds received in that action, at New Orleans, 18 March 1863. He was interred in his family's plot in Laurel Hill Cemetery, Philadelphia, Pennsylvania.

References

External links
Andrew Boyd Cummings Papers, 1847-1935 (bulk 1847-1863, 1913) MS 268 held by Special Collection & Archives, Nimitz Library at the United States Naval Academy

1830 births
1863 deaths
United States Navy officers
Union Navy officers
Military personnel from Philadelphia
People of Pennsylvania in the American Civil War
Union military personnel killed in the American Civil War